Pole Position is an animated series produced by DIC Enterprises and MK Company. The series is loosely based on the arcade racing video game series Pole Position, the name of which was licensed from Namco to capitalize on its popularity. The game and the show have very little in common, other than Wheels being red as in Pole Position and Roadie being blue as in Pole Position II.

Production
This show was produced by DIC Audiovisuel's American branch DIC Enterprises in association with Japanese studio MK Company. The animation services were provided by Artmic, Mushi Production, and K.K. DIC Asia. The character designs were provided by Filipino cartoonist Jesse Santos, and the mechanical designs were provided by Artmic's co-founder Shinji Aramaki.

Broadcast
Pole Position ran for 13 episodes on CBS in 1984 as part of its Saturday morning children's programming line-up. The show had reruns for a few months on Showtime Family-Time Presentation in 1986, followed by a run on The Family Channel (now Freeform) from the late 1980s through the early 1990s. 

It was also shown in the United Kingdom during the 1980s, at first on Saturday Superstore in 1986 and in the CBBC strand, then was repeated in the early 1990s on Saturday mornings as part of Going Live on BBC1.

Plot
The show features the Darretts, a family of stunt-driving crime fighters, who investigated and thwarted wrongdoing while operating under the front of a traveling show known as the "Pole Position Stunt Show", which was sponsored by the United States government in order to give cover for their investigative activity and provide maintenance for the high-demand vehicles. The Darretts had two adult children and a third child who was much younger in age. A road accident ended the life of the parents, and the father's younger brother, known as Uncle Zack, took charge of the stunt show. He said that now that the patriarch and his wife were dead, it was incumbent upon the two adult children, Tess and Dan, to continue their parents' dangerous and proud work.

The vehicles feature numerous hidden gadgets like water skis and hover jets. The vehicles' computers themselves are portable and can be removed from the dashboards and carried around using handles—thus they are often referred to as "the modules". The modules are characters appearing as talking computer-drawn faces displayed on video screens.

Characters
 Tess Darrett – Tess is the older sister of Dan and Daisy and the de facto leader of the group who drives Wheels. Tess is voiced by Lisa Lindgren.
 Dan Darrett – Tess's hot-headed younger brother who drives Roadie. Dan is voiced by David Coburn.
 Daisy Darrett – The younger pre-teen sister of Dan and Tess. Daisy is voiced by Kaleena Kiff.
 Dr. Zachary Darrett – A wheelchair-using engineer and uncle of the Darrett kids. He runs the Pole Position operation and vehicle development. He is voiced by Jack Angel.
 Kuma – Daisy's pet, Kuma is a strange genetic hybrid between a raccoon and a monkey. Kuma is voiced by Marilyn Schreffler.
 Wheels – a red and black 1965 Ford Mustang driven by Tess. Wheels's AI computer is more careful than Roadie. Wheels is voiced by Melvin Franklin, who was a member of The Temptations.
 Roadie – a more futuristic-looking light-blue coupe driven by Dan. Roadie's AI computer is very smart and keeps Dan out of trouble. Roadie is voiced by Darryl Hickman.

Crew
 Story editors: Michael Reaves and Jean Chalopin
 Writers: Marc Scott Zicree, Chuck Lorre, Ted Pedersen, Rowby Goren, Michael Reaves
 Director: Bernard Deyriès

Episodes

Principal cast
 Lisa Lindgren – Tess Darrett
 Kaleena Kiff – Daisy Darrett
 David Coburn – Dan Darrett
 Jack Angel – Dr. Zachary Darrett
 Marilyn Scheffler – Kuma
 Mel Franklin – Wheels
 Darryl Hickman – Roadie

Additional voices
 Neilson Ross
 Paul Kirby
 Phillip Clark
 Jered Barclay
 Brian Cummings
 Irv Immerman
 Steve Schatzberg
 Barry Gordon
 Derek McGrath
 Tony Pope
 Hal Smith
 Bob Towers

DVD release
Brightspark Productions released a 4-disc box set containing all 13 complete episodes of the series on DVD in the UK on April 21, 2008.

Mill Creek Entertainment released 10 of the 13 episodes of the series in a combo pack with 10 episodes of C.O.P.S. and 10 episodes of Jayce and the Wheeled Warriors on January 10, 2012. Later in October 2016, Mill Creek released TV Toons To Go, a 10-disc compilation of various cartoons owned by Cookie Jar, now by DHX Media, and the 10th disc of that set contains the remaining 3 episodes of Pole Position that weren't included on the combo pack DVD set.

References

External links
 
 80scartoons.co.uk

1984 American television series debuts
1984 American television series endings
1984 French television series debuts
1984 French television series endings
1984 Japanese television series debuts
Animated series based on video games
CBS original programming
1980s American animated television series
1980s French animated television series
American children's animated science fiction television series
French children's animated science fiction television series
Japanese children's animated science fiction television series
Animated television series about families
Television series by DIC Entertainment
Television series by DHX Media
English-language television shows
Works based on Bandai Namco video games
Television series created by Jean Chalopin